Derrick Watkins (born 15 March 1983) is an Australian former professional rugby league footballer who last played for the Redcliffe Dolphins in the Queensland Rugby League. 

He previously played for the North Queensland Cowboys and the Brisbane Broncos in the National Rugby League (NRL).

Background
Watkins was born in Mount Isa, Queensland, Australia.

Playing career
Watkins made his first grade debut for North Queensland in Round 19 2002 against Canberra.  In 2008, Watkins joined Brisbane and played 4 games for the club.  

His last game in first grade was a 24-20 loss against St George in Round 23 2008.

Watkins was eligible to play for Wales and Australia.

References

External links
Redcliffe Dolphins profile
Brisbane Broncos profile
Moon Named In Centres

1983 births
Living people
Australian rugby league players
Indigenous Australian rugby league players
Australian people of Welsh descent
North Queensland Cowboys players
Brisbane Broncos players
Australian Aboriginal rugby league team players
Redcliffe Dolphins players
Rugby league second-rows
Rugby league players from Mount Isa